Two Thrones is a real-time grand strategy video game developed and published by Paradox Interactive. It is the sequel to the international version of Svea Rike III, Europa Universalis: Crown of the North.

Reception

The game received "mixed" reviews according to the review aggregation website Metacritic.

References

External links

2004 video games
Grand strategy video games
Paradox Interactive games
Real-time strategy video games
Video game sequels
Video games developed in Sweden
Windows games
Windows-only games
Strategy First games